Herreros is a Spanish surname. Notable people with the surname include:

Alberto Herreros (born 1969), Spanish basketball player
Javier Herreros (born 1984), Spanish footballer
Manuel Herreros (born 1963), Spanish motorcycle racer
Toni Herreros (born 1972), Spanish slalom canoeist

See also
Herrero

Spanish-language surnames